Kokruagarok is a small unincorporated community in North Slope Borough, Alaska, United States.

References

Populated places of the Arctic United States
Unincorporated communities in North Slope Borough, Alaska
Unincorporated communities in Alaska
Populated coastal places in Alaska on the Arctic Ocean